New Kangal station, also written as Yenikangal, is a railway station in Kangal, Turkey.

New Kangal is located on the northern perimeter of the town of Kangal ( north of the town center) compared to Kangal station, which is located near the village of Karanlık ( northeast of the town center.

The station consists of one side platform and one track, with a small freight yard of five tracks adjacent to it. TCDD Taşımacılık operates three daily intercity trains from Ankara (temporarily Irmak) to Kars, Kurtalan, and Tatvan, as well as a twice daily regional train from Sivas to Divriği.

References

External links
Kangal station timetable

Railway stations in Sivas Province
Railway stations opened in 2012
2012 establishments in Turkey
Kangal District